John Penrose Barron,  (27 April 1934 – 16 August 2008) was a British classical scholar. He was Director of the Institute of Classical Studies, University of London from 1984 to 1991, and Master of St Peter's College, Oxford, from 1991 to 2003.

Early life and education
Barron was born on 27 April 1934 in Morley, Yorkshire, England. He was educated at Queen Elizabeth Grammar School, an all-boys private school in Wakefield, and at Clifton College, then also an all-boys independent school in Bristol. He matriculated into Balliol College, Oxford, in 1953; he had originally intended to study law but was convinced by a college tutor to switch to Lit. Hum. (Classics). Among his tutors were Kenneth Dover and Russell Meiggs. He graduated from the University of Oxford with a first class Bachelor of Arts (B.A) degree in 1957. He remained at Oxford to study for a Doctor of Philosophy (DPhil) degree under the supervision of Antony Andrewes, which he completed in 1961. His doctoral thesis was on the early history of Samos, and was titled The history of Samos to 439 B. C..

Academic career
Barron began his academic career in 1959, having been appointed an assistant lecturer in Latin at Bedford College, London: he was promoted to lecturer in 1961. In 1964, he joined University College, London as a lecturer in archaeology. He was appointed Reader in Archaeology and Numismatics in 1967.

In 1971, he was appointed Professor of Greek Language and Literature at King's College, London: he was therefore appointed to a chair at the unusually young age of 37. He was Head of the King's Department of Classics from 1972 to 1984, and Dean of its Faculty of Arts from 1976 to 1980. He then moved into leadership positions in the wider University of London, serving as Director of the Institute of Classical Studies from 1984 to 1991, and Dean of the Institute for Advanced Study from 1989 to 1991. He was "instrumental in setting up the University of London Institute for Advanced Study", an body which brought together the various research institutes of the university: it would go on to become the School of Advanced Study.

In 1991, Barron was elected the 7th Master of St Peter's College, Oxford. He would go on to serve two five-year terms and a two-year extension, before retiring in 2003. During his time as master, he increased the number of female students at his college from fewer than 30 percent to almost half. He also greatly expanded the physical footprint of the college, adding three new buildings. He also attempted to add the former Oxford Prison to the portfolio but this was vetoed by the college's governing body. He was also Chairman of the Conference of Colleges, the association of Oxford Colleges, from 1993 to 1995, and Chairman of the University of Oxford's Admissions Committee from 1997 to 2000. As the latter, he aimed to widen the university's intake, and encouraged an increase in the number of state educated students.

In retirement, he was an honorary fellow of St Peter's College, Oxford and a visiting professor at King's College, London.

Personal life
In 1962, Barron married Caroline Mary Hogarth, a medieval historian. She is the granddaughter of David George Hogarth, a noted archaeologist and decorated naval intelligence officer. Together they had two daughters.

After a short time living with pancreatic cancer, Barron died on 16 August 2008 in London, England: he was aged 74.

Selected works

References

External links
 St Peter's College – Archives: The Papers of Professor John Barron

1934 births
2008 deaths
British classical scholars
Academics of Bedford College, London
Masters of St Peter's College, Oxford
Classical scholars of the University of London
People from Morley, West Yorkshire
People educated at Clifton College
Alumni of Balliol College, Oxford
Fellows of the Society of Antiquaries of London
Members of Academia Europaea
Academics of University College London
Classical archaeologists
British numismatists
Academics of King's College London
Deaths from pancreatic cancer
People educated at Queen Elizabeth Grammar School, Wakefield
Deaths from cancer in England